North of Hudson Bay is a 1923 American silent action film directed by John Ford starring Tom Mix and Kathleen Key. It was released as North of the Yukon in Great Britain.

Plot
As described in a film magazine review, Peter Dane is assassinated at the Hudson's Bay trading post. His brother Michael comes down the river by steamboat and arrives at the post. After saving her hat by jumping into the water to retrieve it, he falls in love with Estelle McDonald. When he is suspected of murder, Michael is cast out into the wilderness with Angus McKenzie, the accused murderer of Michael's brother. They are joined by Estelle, who is fleeing from the pursuit of an unwelcome suitor and his band. After a terrific fight, the lovers escape through the rapids in a canoe.

Cast

Preservation
Approximately 40 minutes of footage are in existence. Prints of the film also exist in several United States and European film archives and collections.

See also
Tom Mix filmography

References

External links

1923 films
1920s action films
American silent feature films
American black-and-white films
Films directed by John Ford
Fox Film films
Films with screenplays by Jules Furthman
American action films
1920s American films
Silent action films